Spiral is a solo album by pianist Kenny Barron, recorded in 1982 and first released on the Japanese Baybridge label.

Reception

In his review on AllMusic, Ken Dryden notes: "One of the more obscure releases by Kenny Barron, this hard to find CD of solo piano is worth seeking".

Track listing 
All compositions by Kenny Barron except where noted.
 "Spiral" – 11:12
 "Passion Dance" (McCoy Tyner) – 3:52
 "Reflections" (Thelonious Monk) – 4:57
 "Dolores Street, S.F." – 9:35
 "Little Niles" (Randy Weston) – 6:05
 "Maiden Voyage" (Herbie Hancock) – 5:06

Personnel 
Kenny Barron – piano

References 

Kenny Barron albums
1982 albums
Solo piano jazz albums